Pinot may refer to:

Pinot (grape), a grape family
Pinot (surname)
Pinot (restaurant), a restaurant by chef Joachim Splichal

See also
Pino (disambiguation)
Pinot simple flic, a 1984 French film with Gérard Jugnot